Walt Robertson (12 November 1925 – 5 September 2014) was a Canadian rower. He competed in the men's eight event at the 1948 Summer Olympics.

References

External links
 

1925 births
2014 deaths
Canadian male rowers
Olympic rowers of Canada
Rowers at the 1948 Summer Olympics
Place of birth missing